Garth Felix (born December 8, 1966) is retired boxer from Grenada, who fought at the 1988 Summer Olympics in the men's light middleweight division. He also represented Grenada at the 1987 Pan American Games.

1988 Olympic results
Below is the record of Garth Felix, a Grenadian light middleweight boxer who competed at the 1988 Seoul Olympics:

 Round of 64: lost to Nobert Nieroba (West Germany) by first-round knockout

References

Grenadian male boxers
Living people
Light-heavyweight boxers
Boxers at the 1988 Summer Olympics
Olympic boxers of Grenada
Boxers at the 1987 Pan American Games
Pan American Games competitors for Grenada
1966 births